The communauté de communes Plateau de Caux-Fleur de Lin  was created on  and is located in the Seine-Maritime département of the Normandy  region of northern France. It was created in December 2001. It was merged into the new Communauté de communes Plateau de Caux-Doudeville-Yerville in January 2017.

Participants 
The Communauté de communes comprised the following communes:

Amfreville-les-Champs
Anvéville
Bénesville
Berville, Seine-Maritime
Boudeville
Bretteville-Saint-Laurent
Canville-les-Deux-Églises
Carville-Pot-de-Fer 
Doudeville
Étalleville
Fultot 
Gonzeville 
Harcanville
Héricourt-en-Caux
Le Torp-Mesnil
Pretot-Vicquemare
Reuville
Robertot
Routes
Saint-Laurent-en-Caux
Yvecrique

See also
Communes of the Seine-Maritime department

References 

Plateau de Caux-Fleur de Lin